Minchinhampton is an ancient Cotswolds market town in the Stroud District in Gloucestershire, South West England. The common offers wide views over the Severn Estuary into Wales and further into the Cotswolds.

Toponymy
The place-name 'Minchinhampton' is first attested as Hantone in the Domesday Book of 1086. It appears as Minchenhamtone in the Assize Rolls of 1221. The name was originally the Old English Heatun, meaning "high town or settlement". The additional element is the Old English mynecen, meaning a nun, which is related to the modern word "monk". Minchinhampton at one time belonged to the nunnery in Caen in Normandy, France. Thus the name means "the nuns' high town or settlement". . On a map of 1825 (published 1828) the town is labelled "Minching-Hampton" (see external links).

Amenities and features

The main square has a war memorial, and a 17th-century Market House, given to the town in 1919 by the Lord of the Manor, Lt Col. H. G. Ricardo, and restored in 1944.

A market is held on the first Saturday of each month. There is a twice-yearly craft fair at Gatcombe and an annual summer visit by Gifford's Circus. Minchinhampton Country Fayre is held every other year in the High Street.

The small high street includes Henry's Dairy, The Kitchen coffee shop, and a corner shop. There is also a post office, and Boots pharmacy.

Sports facilities

Horse trials
Minchinhampton is near to the main home of the Princess Royal, Gatcombe Park, which hosts the Gatcombe Horse Trials in late summer each year.

Rugby

The rugby club has three adult teams, minis and juniors from under 6 to under 16, and a large touch-rugby section. Minchinhampton RFC plays in the league Gloucester 2 North. In 2014, the club's players were joined by Gatcombe Park resident Mike Tindall, a 2003 Rugby World Cup winner and ex-England and Gloucester RFC rugby international married to Zara Phillips, the daughter of the Princess Royal.

Golf
Minchinhampton Golf Club has three courses. The Cherington and Avening courses lie near villages of the same names, south-east of Minchinhampton. The Old Course is on Minchinhampton Common.

Tennis
The Minchinhampton Tennis Club is situated on the Stuart Playing Fields in Minchinhampton. The Team often competes in regional/national events.

Governance
The Minchinhampton electoral ward stretches eastwards to Aston Down. It had a population of 4,357 according to the 2011 census. The town is twinned with Nkokoto, Tanzania.

Churches

Minchinhampton has two places of worship: the Anglican parish church of the Holy Trinity Church, and Minchinhampton Baptist Church.

The spire of the parish church was pulled down for safety reasons in 1563, after the nave arches supporting it were found to be failing. The stub was then surmounted by a coronet structure. James Bradley, the third Astronomer Royal, was buried in the churchyard of Holy Trinity in 1762.

Minchinhampton Baptist Church in Tetbury Street dates from 1834. The original Chapel Lane Baptist chapel dating from 1765 is now a private house.

The Common

Minchinhampton Common is a Site of Special Scientific Interest. It has been owned by the National Trust since 1913, but only managed by it since 2000. The Common is also used as grazing for cows and horses from May to October. It has long, parallel ditches and mounds known as the Bulwarks, which formed part of a large Iron Age fort. There are wide views from the Common, west over the Severn estuary into Wales, and east to the Golden Valley and further into the Cotswolds.

The limestone Longstone of Minchinhampton is supposedly the burial site of a Danish leader. As a standing stone it more probably dates back to the Bronze Age.

Aston Down

Minchinhampton is close to the former Royal Air Force airfield, Aston Down, formerly a major employer, but now closed and used only for gliding. In 2005, after a Freedom of Information request, the local newspaper revealed that Aston Down is contaminated with arsenic, hydrocarbons and radium. Since the site lies above a vulnerable aquifer, local residents have formed an Aston Down Action Group aimed at persuading local and central government agencies to implement more stringent safety regulations.

Discoveries

One of the world's oldest tyrannosaurs, Proceratosaurus, was excavated from Minchinhampton reservoir.

Notable residents
In birth order:
James Bradley (1693–1762), astronomer and university professor, was buried here. His grave is marked by the James Bradley Monument in Minchinhampton Church.
Mary Deverell (1731–1805), religious writer and poet, was born and buried here.
Jolly John Nash (1828–1901), born here and became a music hall entertainer in London.
Flora Annie Steel (1847–1929), writer, died in Minchinhampton.
Jenny Joseph (1932–2018), poet, lived in the town.
Anne, Princess Royal (born 1950), lives in Gatcombe Park.
Keith Allen (born 1953), actor, lives in the parish.
Robert Addie (1960–2003), actor – his ashes are interred in Holy Trinity churchyard.

References

External links

Minchinhampton Parish website
Minchinhampton Market House
 Stroud Voices (Minchinhampton filter) – oral history site
britishlibrary.georeferencer.com/compare# 1825 map showing "Minching-Hampton"

Towns in Gloucestershire
Market towns in Gloucestershire
Stroud District
Civil parishes in Gloucestershire